Culture system may refer to:
Cultivation System in Dutch-governed Indonesia
Cultural system